Ghanemiyeh-ye Isa (also Romanized as Ghānemīyeh-ye ‘Īsá; also known as Ghānemīyeh and Raddeh-ye Ghānemīyeh) is a village in Jazireh-ye Minu Rural District, Minu District, Khorramshahr County, Khuzestan Province, Iran. At the 2006 census, its population was 221, in 45 families.

References 

Populated places in Khorramshahr County